The current format of Vehicle registration plates of Kazakhstan uses black letters on a white background with a Kazakh Flag and the country code KZ on the left. The two digit area code is located on the square located on the right and the rest of the plate follows the format 111AAA. This format was introduced in 2011 and was implemented from August 2012.

Design until August 2012

This format of Vehicle registration plates of Kazakhstan used black letters on a white background. Each registration plate consisted of a single letter identifying the area and three digits and two letters identifying the non-individual car (for example: A 001 AA) or of a single letter identifying the area and three digits and three letters identifying the individual car (for example: A 585 CUO)

Special registration plates also exist.  Cars registered to non-Kazakh individuals and organizations have registration plates with black letters on a yellow background.  Diplomatic vehicles use registration plates with white letters on a red background.

Regional codes

Codes on government plates

Codes on Soviet era plates

External links

Transport in Kazakhstan
Kazakhstan
Kazakhstan transport-related lists